Experiments In Alchemy  is the second release by Dog Fashion Disco, originally self-released by the band in 1998. It was re-released by Rotten Records in 2006. As with DFD's succeeding album, Embryo's in Bloom, tracks 3-8 were later re-recorded and released on later albums.

Track listing

Personnel
Todd Smith – Vocals
Sennen Quigley – Keyboards, Guitar
Greg Combs – Guitar
Mark Ammen – Bass
John Ensminger – Drums, Percussion

Additional Personnel
Geoff Stewart – Alto/Tenor/Bari Sax
Kristen Ensminger – Trumpet
Pat Euler – Additional Percussion
Dog Fashion Disco – Producer
James Halsey – Co-Producer, Engineer
Greg Jenkins – Co-Engineer
Paul Minor – Mixing, Mastering
Paul Campenella – Art Direction and Production
Chris Ehrmann – Cover Photography

References

1998 albums
Dog Fashion Disco albums